Catasetum saccatum, the sack-shaped catasetum, is a species of orchid.

saccatum
Plants described in 1840